Homeobox protein Nkx-2.5 is a protein that in humans is encoded by the NKX2-5 gene.

Function 

Homeobox-containing genes play critical roles in regulating tissue-specific gene expression essential for tissue differentiation, as well as determining the temporal and spatial patterns of development (Shiojima et al., 1995). It has been demonstrated that a Drosophila homeobox-containing gene called 'tinman' is expressed in the developing dorsal vessel and in the equivalent of the vertebrate heart. Mutations in tinman result in loss of heart formation in the embryo, suggesting that tinman is essential for Drosophila heart formation. Furthermore, abundant expression of Csx, the presumptive mouse homolog of tinman, is observed only in the heart from the time of cardiac differentiation. CSX, the human homolog of murine Csx, has a homeodomain sequence identical to that of Csx and is expressed only in the heart, again suggesting that CSX plays an important role in human heart formation.
In humans, proper NKX2-5 expression is essential for the development of atrial, ventricular, and conotruncal septation, atrioventricular  (AV) valve formation, and maintenance of AV conduction. Mutations in expression are associated with congenital heart disease (CHD) and related ailments. Patients with NKX2-5 mutations commonly present AV conduction block and atrial septal defects (ASD). Recently, postnatal roles of cardiac transcription factors have been extensively investigated. Consistent with the direct transactivation of numerous cardiac genes reactivated in response to hypertrophic stimulation, cardiac transcription factors are profoundly involved in the generation of cardiac hypertrophy or in cardioprotection from cytotoxic stress in the adult heart. The NKX2-5 transcription factor may help myocytes endure cytotoxic stress, however further exploration in this field is required.

NK-2 homeobox genes are a family of genes that encode for numerous transcription factors that go on to aid in the development of many structures including the thyroid, colon, and heart. Of the NK-2 genes, NKX2-5 transcription factor is mostly involved in cardiac development and defects with this gene can lead to congenital heart defects including, but not limited to atrial septal defects. NKX2-5 is expressed in precursor cardiac cells and this expression is necessary in order to lead to proper cardiac development. In NKX2-5 gene knock out mice, subjects were found to have induced congenital heart defects by leading to differentially expressed genes. In the case of loss of function of NKX2-5, test subjects developed increased heart rate and decreased variability in heart rate. This discovery indicates that NKX2-5 is necessary for proper cardiac formatting as well as proper cardiac function after formatting. NKX2-5 has also been shown to bind to the promoter of FGF-16 and regulate its expression.  This finding suggests that NKX2-5 is implicated in cardiac injury via cytotoxic effects.

Interactions 
During embryogenesis, NKX2-5 is expressed in early cardiac mesoderm cells throughout the left ventricle and atrial chambers. In early cardiogenesis, cardiac precursor cells from the cardiac crescent congregate along the ventral midline of the developing embryo and form the linear heart tube. In Nkx2-5 knock out mice, cardiac development halts at the linear heart tube stage and looping morphogenesis disrupted.

NKX2-5 has been shown to interact with GATA4 and TBX5.
NKX2-5 is a transcription factor that regulates heart development from the Cardiac Crescent of the splanchnic mesoderm in humans. NKX2-5 is dependent upon the JAK-STAT pathway and works along with MEF2, HAND1, and HAND2 transcription factors to direct heart looping during early heart development. NKX2-5 in vertebrates is equivalent to the ‘tinman’ gene in Drosophila and directly activates the MEF2 gene to control cardiomyocyte differentiation. NKX2-5 operates in a positive feedback loop with GATA transcription factors to regulate cardiomyocyte formation. NKX2-5 influences HAND1 and HAND2 transcription factors that control the essential asymmetrical development of the heart's ventricles. The gene has been show to play a role in the heart's conduction system, postnatally. NKX2-5 is also involved in the intrinsic mechanisms that decide ventricle and atrial cellular fate. During ventricular chamber formation, NKX2-5 and NKX2-7 are required to maintain cardiomyocyte cellular identity. Repression of either gene results in the differentiating cardiomyocytes to move towards atrial chamber identity. The NKX2-5 mutation has also been associated with preeclampsia; though research is still being conducting in this area.

References

Further reading

External links 
 

Transcription factors